Sherman Reed is an American baseball coach and former player, who is the head baseball coach of the Coppin State Eagles. He played college baseball at Towson from 1979 to 1983.

Playing career
Reed played collegiality for the Towson Tigers baseball team from 1979 to 1983. He then went on to play ten years of independent baseball.

Coaching career
Reed served as a coach at Western School of Technology and Environmental Science and Catonsville High School. Reed also spent the 2008 and 2009 seasons as an assistant at Coppin State.

On July 9, 2010, Reed was named the head coach of the Coppin State baseball team. On May 9, 2018, Reed broke the Coppin State record for career wins with his 84th win. In 2018, Reed lead the Eagles to their first ever Mid-Eastern Athletic Conference (MEAC) Northern Division title. On May 15, 2018, Reed was named the MEAC Coach of the Year.

Personal life
Reed's wife is named Dorothy. Together, they had at least one son, Sherman Jr.

Reed's son, Sherman Jr., played college baseball at Southern University. He was shot and killed in his Violetville home in August 2019 at 31 years old.

Head coaching record

See also
 List of current NCAA Division I baseball coaches

References

External links

Coppin State Eagles bio

Living people
Towson Tigers baseball players
High school baseball coaches in the United States
Coppin State Eagles baseball coaches
Year of birth missing (living people)
Baseball coaches from Maryland
Sportspeople from Baltimore
African-American baseball coaches
Johns Hopkins Carey Business School alumni